Sandymount railway station serves Sandymount and Ballsbridge (including RDS Simmonscourt) in Dublin, Ireland. It has two platforms, both fully accessible via ramps.

There is a level crossing as the railway line crosses Sandymount Avenue. The Level Crossing is a MCB-CCTV (Manual Controlled Barrier level crossing).

History
Sandymount Halt was originally opened in January 1835.  The station had several period of closure: from 1841 to 1860; 1862 to 1882; 1901 to 1928 and from 1960. The station was reopened in 1984 with the electrification of Dublin suburban rail services - launched as the DART.

The station was also re-opened with a one-off temporary platform for Queen Victoria's first visit to Ireland in 1849 when she and her entourage traveled by special train from Kingstown to Sandymount before continuing by horse carriage to Dublin.

Operations
The ticket office is open from 06:00 AM to 20:00 PM, Monday to Sunday.

Transport services 
Directly outside the station on Sandymount Avenue are bus stops for the following route:

 Go Ahead Ireland route 18 from Sandymount to Rialto. This route provides a connection to the Luas Green Line at Ranelagh, as well as the Red Line at Rialto.

In addition, a number of bus services stop on Merrion Road, located 300 m from the station:

 Dublin Bus route 4 from Harristown to Monkstown
 Dublin Bus routes 7 / 7A from Mountjoy Square to Bride's Glen / Loughlinstown
 Dublin Bus 7N Nitelink from Dublin city centre to Shankill (Friday & Saturday only)
 Aircoach route 703 from Killiney to Dublin Airport
 Aircoach route 702 from Greystones to Dublin Airport

See also
 List of railway stations in Ireland

References

External links
 Irish Rail Sandymount Station Website

Sandymount
Iarnród Éireann stations in Dublin (city)
1835 establishments in Ireland
Railway stations in the Republic of Ireland opened in 1835